Ajay Maroo (29 October 1958) is an Indian politician from Bharatiya Janata Party, and he was a member of the Parliament of India representing Jharkhand in the Rajya Sabha, the upper house of the Indian Parliament.

References

External links
 Profile on Rajya Sabha website

Bharatiya Janata Party politicians from Jharkhand
Rajya Sabha members from Jharkhand
Living people
1958 births
Place of birth missing (living people)